Md Tofazzel Hossain Miah is a Bangladeshi civil servant and the Principal Secretary of the Prime Ministers' office.  He also served as PS-1 to Prime Minister of Bangladesh Sheikh Hasina and Senior Secretary, Prime Minister's Office,Bangladesh.

Early life 
Miah completed his undergraduate and graduate studies in English Literature from the University of Dhaka. He completed his post graduate studies from BRAC University.

Career 
Miah joined the Bangladesh Civil Service in 1991 as an Assistant Commissioner. He served as the Assistant Commissioner in Bagerhat Sadar Upazila. He had served as the  Upazila Nirbahi Officer in Narsingdi District.

Miah is the former District Magistrate of Comilla District and Panchagarh District. He served as the Additional Deputy Commissioner in Sylhet District. He served Deputy Commissioner of Dhaka District.

Miah was appointed Personal Secretary to Prime Minister Sheikh Hasina on 25 January 2018.

On 20 February 2020, Miah was appointed Director of Grameen Bank.

Miah was appointed Secretary of the Prime Minister's Office in January 2021. On 11 March 2021, Miah was appointed non executive director of British American Tobacco Bangladesh. Mian was promoted to Senior Secretary on 29 December 2021. He is a director of Hotels International Limited. He is a director of Titas Gas. He is a director of Bangladesh Infrastructure Finance Fund Limited.

In June 2022, Miah signed an agreement with Major General Abul Kalam Mohammad Ziaur Rahman of Bangladesh Export Processing Zone Authority on behalf of the Prime Ministers' office. He presided Annual Performance Agreement of the seven organs under the Prime Minister's Office. He is a director of Infrastructure Development Company. He described the economic growth engine of Bangladesh as the private industry.

References 

Living people
Bangladeshi civil servants
BRAC University alumni
Year of birth missing (living people)